Philip Albert Snow OBE (7 August 1915 – 4 June 2012) was an English cricketer.

In 1936 Snow made his debut for the Leicestershire Second XI against the Nottinghamshire Second XI. From 1936 to 1937 Snow played four matches for the Leicestershire Second XI.

Snow made his first-class debut for Fiji in 1948 against Auckland during Fiji's tour of New Zealand. Snow made 5 first-class appearances on tour, with his final first-class match for Fiji coming against Auckland.

In his 5 first-class matches for Fiji he scored 121 runs at a batting average of 17.28, with a high score of 38. With the ball he took 4 wickets at a bowling average of 25.25, with best figures of 2/60.

Philip Snow was the younger brother of the scientist and author C. P. Snow – of whom he wrote the biography Stranger and brother: a portrait of C. P. Snow (1982) – and the historian Eric Snow. He was educated at Alderman Newton's School, Leicester and Christ's College, Cambridge, and was by profession a colonial administrator in Fiji.

References

External links
Philip Snow at Cricinfo
Philip Snow at CricketArchive

1915 births
2012 deaths
Alumni of Christ's College, Cambridge
Officers of the Order of the British Empire
Cricketers from Leicester
Fijian cricketers
English emigrants to Fiji
British colonial governors and administrators in Oceania